Navigators Insurance Cycling Team (UCI Code: NIC) was an elite road bicycle racing cycling team in the United States.  Navigators focused on USA Cycling and UCI America Tour events.  The team has competed in every Tour de Georgia. The team was founded in 1992 by Raymond Cipollini and James Eichvalds. The team turned Pro in 1994 and hired Edward Beamon to be its director.

Navigators finished third team on the 2005–06 UCI America Tour.

2007 team roster
As at 1 January 2007:

Major wins 

Results:
1995
 Reading Classic, Matt Koschara
1997
 Stage 2 Vuelta al Tachira en Bicicleta, Skip Spangenburg
 Nevada City Classic, Scott Moninger
 Stage 6 Clasica Regatas Lima, Skip Spangenburg
1998
 Stage 5 Redlands Classic, Trent Klasna
 Overall Sea Otter Classic, Trent Klasna
 Nevada City Classic, Michael Engleman
 Stage 3 Tour de Beauce, Skip Spangenburg
 Prologue & Stage 4 Killington Stage Race, Scott Moninger
 Prologue & Stage 1 Clasica Regatas Lima, Skip Spangenburg
 Stages 11 & 12 Herald Sun Tour, Scott Moninger
 Mountain Jersey Herald Sun Tour, Scott Moninger
1999
 Stage 5 Cascade Cycling Classic, Vassili Davidenko
 Stage 9 New Zealand Cycle Classic, Brendan Vesty
 Stage 1 Sea Otter Classic, Trent Klasna
 Overall Killington Stage Race, Trent Klasna
 Stages 1, 2 & 3, Trent Klasna
 Overall Tour de Okinawa, Mark Walters
2000
 Prologue Redlands Classic, Todd Littlehales
 Points Jersey Redlands Classic, Todd Littlehales
 Tour Lefleur, Adham Sbeih
 Stages 2, 3 & 6 Tour de Beauce, Vassili Davidenko
 Stage 2 Killington Stage Race, Christopher Baldwin
2001
 Stages 3 & 5 New Zealand Cycle Classic, Brendan Vesty
 Stage 2 Sea Otter Classic, Vassili Davidenko
 Points Jersey Sea Otter Classic, Vassili Davidenko
 Stage 6 Giro d'Abruzzo, Vassili Davidenko
 Stages 4 & 6 Cascade Cycling Classic, Christopher Baldwin
2002
 Grand Prix de Rennes, Kirk O'Bee
 GP Pino Cerami, Kirk O'Bee
 Tallinn-Tartu GP, Oleg Grishkine
 Overall Rás Tailteann, Ciaran Power
 Philly Cycling Classic, Mark Walters
 Stage 2 Cascade Cycling Classic, Burke Swindlehurst
 Mountain classifiction Tour of Southland, Tom Leaper
2003
 Grand Prix de Rennes, Oleg Grishkine
 Stage 1 Tour de Georgia, Henk Vogels
 Stages 3 & 7 Rás Tailteann, Ciaran Power
 Stage 2 Tour de Beauce, Oleg Grishkine
 Stage 5 Tour de Beauce, Christopher Baldwin
 Stage 6 Tour de Beauce, Vassili Davidenko
 Overall Tour of South China Sea, Oleg Grishkine
Stages 1, 4, 5 & 6, Oleg Grishkine
Points classification, Oleg Grishkine
2004
 Bay Cycling Classic, David McKenzie
 Stage 6 Tour of Turkey, Viktor Rapinski
Tour de Beauce
Stage 6, Ciaran Power
Points classification, Viktor Rapinski
Mountain classification, Jeff Louder
 Stage 3 Cascade Cycling Classic, Christopher Baldwin
 Stages 1, 4 & 9 Tour of Qinghai Lake, Viktor Rapinski
 Stage 2 Tour of Qinghai Lake, Jeff Louder
 Points classification Tour of Qinghai Lake, Viktor Rapinski
 Stage 4 Tour of Queensland, David McKenzie
2005
 Stage 5 Bay Cycling Classic, Hilton Clarke
  National Time Trial Championships, Nathan O'Neill
 Stage 4 Tour de Langkawi, Nathan O'Neill
 Overall Tour de Beauce, Nathan O'Neill
Youth classification, David O'Loughlin
Stage 3, David O'Loughlin
Stage 4, Nathan O'Neill
Stage 5, Vassili Davidenko
  National Time Trial Championships, Christopher Baldwin
  National Time Trial Championships, Piotr Mazur
  National Road Race Championships, David O'Loughlin
 Stage 3 Cascade Cycling Classic, Nathan O'Neill
 Stages 4 & 6 Cascade Cycling Classic, Kirk O'Bee
 Stage 7 Herald Sun Tour, Hilton Clarke
2006
 Overall Bay Cycling Classic, Hilton Clarke
 Stages 4 & 7 Rás Tailteann, Ciaran Power
 Mountains classification Rás Tailteann, Ciaran Power
 Overall Tour de Beauce, Valery Kobzarenko
Points classification, Sergey Lagutin
Stage 1, Valery Kobzarenko
Stage 3, Sergey Lagutin
 Overall Rochester Criterium, Hilton Clarke
 Stage 3 Cascade Cycling Classic, Burke Swindlehurst
 Overall Tour of Elk Grove, Hilton Clarke
  National Criterium Championships, Hilton Clarke
  National Time Trial Championships, David O'Loughlin
 Overall The Reading 120, Shawn Milne
 Stage 1 Herald Sun Tour, Hilton Clarke
 Points classification Tour of Utah, Sergey Lagutin
 Stage 1 Tour of Utah, Sergey Lagutin
2007
  National Time Trial Championships, Glen Chadwick
 Stage 1 Rheinland-Pfalz Rundfahrt, Sergey Lagutin
 Overall Tour de Beauce, Ben Day
Points classification, Ben Day
Stages 2 & 3, Glen Chadwick
Stage 4, Oleg Grishkine
Stage 5, Ben Day
 Overall US Air Force Classic, Kyle Wamsley 
 Nevada City Classic, Darren Lill
 Overall Rochester Criterium, Hilton Clarke
  National Road Race Championships, David O'Loughlin
 Overall Cascade Cycling Classic, Phil Zajicek
Stage 3, Phil Zajicek

References

External links 
Former 

Defunct cycling teams based in the United States
Cycling teams established in 1994
Cycling teams disestablished in 2007
1994 establishments in the United States
2007 disestablishments in the United States